Young Girl is the RIAA Gold-certified second studio album by Gary Puckett & The Union Gap, released in 1968.

The title track hit #1 on the Cash Box Top 100 and #2 on the Billboard Hot 100.  It made it to #34 on the Adult Contemporary chart.   The album landed on the Billboard album chart, reaching #21 and going Gold.

Track listing

Personnel
Gary Puckett - lead vocals, guitar
Kerry Chater - bass guitar, lead vocal on verses 1 and 2 of "Wait Till the Sun Shines on You"
Gary "Mutha" Withem - organ, piano
Dwight Bemont - tenor saxophone
Paul Wheatbread - drums

Chart positions
Album

Singles

References

1968 albums
Gary Puckett & The Union Gap albums
Columbia Records albums